Tim McGraw & Friends is the eighth compilation album by American country music singer Tim McGraw. It was released on January 22, 2013, by Curb Records.

Background
Tim McGraw & Friends is a compilation of McGraw's collaborations with artists Faith Hill, Jerry Lee Lewis and Jon Brion, Kenny Rogers, Ray Benson, Tony Bennett, Jo Dee Messina, Gwyneth Paltrow, Tracy Lawrence, Randy Travis, Colt Ford and Lionel Richie. This 11-track album is McGraw's first album of duets.

Release information
The project was released January 22, 2013, two weeks before the release of McGraw's first album for Big Machine Records, Two Lanes of Freedom. The album was preceded by the release of the song "Twisted" featuring Colt Ford.

Track listing

Chart performance

Album

References

2013 albums
Tim McGraw albums
Curb Records compilation albums